The Hororo or Bahororo are a Bantu speaking ethnicity who live mainly in the north of the former Kigezi District of south-western Uganda. In 1905, they were described by a British officer as a "quiet, inoffensive people" who owned cattle. They are made up mostly of the Hima ethnic group and the Iru ethnic group. They reside mainly in Rujumbura in south-western Uganda and are related to the Banyankole, Banyoro, Batooro, Songora and Tutsi peoples respectively. Rujumbura was ruled by the BeeneKirenzi sub-clan with Omukama Karegyesa as their last king. The Bahororo speak a dialect of Nkore-Kiga, Ruhororo. They are subdivided into clans that are similar to those of the kingdom of Ankole. Unlike Ankole, which was ruled by the Hinda clan, Mpororo was led by the Bashambo clan.

Rise of the Hororo State 

The lands that constituted Mpororo were formerly part of the Chwezi empire until its dissolution in the sixteenth century.

Prior to the middle of seventeenth century, the area that became Mpororo - land of the Hororo - was known as Ndorwa, and constituted the southern province of the kingdom of Busongora. During the reign of Queen Kitami cya Nyawera of Busongora a fugitive Rwandan prince named Kamali Murari arrived at the court of the queen and was granted asylum. Murari was a claimant to the Rwandan throne but he and his supporters were ousted by his brother Kigeri II Nyamuheshera. At that time Rwanda and Songora shared a common border, and Murari and his people escaped and crossed into Busongora.

Murari entered Busongora and was led to the palace of Queen Kitami. The Songora queen is remembered mostly for the fact that she was greatly feared, she was exceptionally attractive, and highly intelligent. Murari stayed at Kitami's royal court and she decided to marry the Rwandan prince. Together they had a son and they named him Kahaya Rutindangyezi. The king Kigeri II of Rwanda to the south decided to invade Busongora in pursuit of Murari. The commander of the Rwandan troops was called Bihira-bya-Muhuruzi. Biriha was a member of the AbaKono sub-clan of the Abega clan.

The war between Busongora and Rwanda was brutal, and long. The capital city of Busongora - named Bunyampaka [the Rwandans called it "Ibumpaka"] and located in what is now Queen Elizabeth National Park - was sacked and burned by Rwandan troops. The Songora armies retaliated and occupied the region around Lake Muhazi in central Rwanda [present day Gahini] and took many Rwandan captives. In the course of the war, the queen, Kitami cya Nyawera, was stung by a bee and died of toxic shock directly after. Kitami's death - around the year 1625 - caused bewilderment among the Basongora generals, and they decided that the war was futile. The Rwandan Royals also had good reason to seek an end to the war - besides war casualties, the reign of their king was troubled by misfortunes. Ncenderi, the Queen of Rwanda and wife to King Kigeri II, would commit suicide before his reign was over.

To end the war, the Rwandans and the Basongora held negotiations and agreed to a truce that would ensure they would never again go to war. The terms of the peace were thus: the region of south Busongora known as Ndorwa was made a buffer state with Prince Murari [brother to Kigeri of Rwanda and consort to Kitami of Busongora] as its first king. The new buffer state was named Mpororo - probably meaning "place of vengeance" as it had been the scene of much bloody violence. Gisaka region in Rwanda that had been occupied by  the Songora also remained autonomous and was only later reincorporated into Rwanda during the reign of Kigeri IV Rwabugiri in the 1880s.

The Basongora Royals, before they decamped from the newly formed Mpororo, handed Murorwa - one of the Songora royal drums - to the new King Murari. This is how Mprororo became an independent state. When Murari passed-on, the throne was inherited by Kahaya Rutindangyezi. Kahaya had many sons and daughters. Mpororo prospered much and made a great name for itself, so much so that it is remembered well even today. The people of Mpororo came to be known as "BaHororo" meaning "people of Mpororo".

At its zenith the kingdom of Mpororo’s borders included all of Kigezi (except the modern Bafumbira saza and part of Kinkizi), the Ankole sazas of Kajara, Igara, sheema and Rwampara (except the low ground south of the Rwizi River), parts of north-eastern Burundi, parts of north-western Tanzania, parts of eastern Congo and the entire northern portion of Rwanda.

Decline of Mpororo 

The state of Mpororo had lasted about 125 years - until about 1775 when it was broken-up into six independent states led by the six sons of Kahaya: Nshenyi state under king Rukaari, Rujumbura state under king Kirenzi, Igara state under king Mafunda, Kajara state under king Kihondwa, Bwera state and Rukiga state. Despite this break-up, all the people of the new states continued to self-identify as primarily as Bahororo, and still do to this day.

Mpororo Kingdom remained more famous than its successor states. In 1887, Henry Morton Stanley was denied permission to cross Mpororo. Stanley's view of the Bahororo was unfortunate: "I had to negotiate with the people of Mpororo who were absolutely savage and never before came into contact with the stranger besides being in perpetual blood feud." Stanley's fellow traveller was Sheikh Ahmed bin Ibrahim, a Muslim trader. The Sheik claimed, "The Bahororo are a great people but they are covetous, malignant, treacherous and utterly untrustworthy. They have never yet allowed Arabs to trade in their country. There is plenty of ivory there during the last eight years. Khamis Bin Abdullah, Tippu Tip, Sayid bin Habib and myself have frequently attempted to enter there but none of us has ever succeeded. You cannot proceed through Mpororo for the people are Shaitan (Satanic) and the Bahororo are wicked and because something happened when the Wangwana (bad people) tried to go there, the natives never tolerated stranger people and are full of guile verily."

The reports of Stanley and the Arab slave traders poisoned the reputation of the Bahororo, as well as the Banyarwanda and the Basongora. When Captain Frederick Lugard and others came to conquer Central Africa, they were afraid of both Hororo and Songora communities and consequently they were cruel towards them. In 1910, the British colonial occupation forcibly annexed all the states of Mpororo and added them to the neighbouring kingdom of Nkore. All throughout its history Nkore had only ever had 3 provinces, now the counties of Isingiro, Nyabushozi and Kashaari. With the addition of old Mpororo, Nkore more than doubled in size. However, even today many people still proudly refer to themselves as Bahororo despite attempts to make them Banyankore.

Modern Era 

The memory of Kitami-kya-Nyawera inspired - in the early 20th century - the powerful politico-religious movement known as Nyabingi that was important during the struggle against colonial occupation. Spirit mediums who were priestesses of the Nyabingyi religion, claimed that Kitami had also been priestesses of Nyabingyi [God] and that they could speak for Nyabingyi [God] - and for Kitami - when they were in a possession trance.
The various hereditary Nyabingyi priestesses of the 18th century often spoke while in trance and only while veiled or behind curtains. In the late 1800s, the Queen of Rwanda Kingdom named Muhumuza became the leading Nyabingyi spirit medium. After her husband - King Kigeri IV Rwabugiri - had died, Queen Muhumuza was exiled from Rwanda, she went in search of the lost drum Murorwa, and also began a resistance movement that sought to unify Central Africa. In the process of resisting the colonial occupation she became the de facto ruler of all the Mpororo states while leading what became known as the Nyabingyi resistance movement. Although centred on Mpororo, the Nyabingi Resistance was active in all of Central and East Africa [especially Uganda, Rwanda, Burundi, Tanzania, and Eastern Congo] between 1850 and 1950.

By the 1890s the Priestess-Queen Muhumuza was the most feared anti-colonial resistance leader in all of Africa. As late as 1891, Emin Pasha also wrote: "The Queen of Mpororo had never seen anyone, not even her own subjects. All that they ever know of her is the voice heard behind the curtain of a bark cloth. Such theatrical practices have gained for her throughout Karagwe, Mpororo, the reputation of a great sorceress capable of bewitching people and also benefiting them."

Muhumuza organized armed resistance against the German, British and French colonialists. She was captured in 1913 and detained by the British in Kampala, Uganda. She died in prison in 1944. She was eulogised by Marcus Garvey when he found out about her demise. She was described by officials of the European colonial government as "an extraordinary character."

The followers of Muhumuza are also responsible for having kept alive the memories of the Songora queen Kitami, and for conserving and transmitting so much of the history of the ancient Busongora and Mpororo. Possessions by Nyabinghi have continued - affecting women mostly - even today, especially in the south-western region of Uganda and the north-western region of Tanzania.

The Jamaica-based Niyabinghi Theocracy Government, a Mansion of Rastafari, was named after the resistance movement and Nyabingi spiritual belief system as led by Muhumuza. The followers of Muhumuza always pay tribute to Kitami-kya-Nyawera as one of the ancient Nyabingi priesthood. The Igongo Museum in Uganda [Mbarara] has a special display dedicated to Kitami-kya-Nyawera that is popular with Rastafarians and others who associate Kitami with the Nyabingyi Movement.

The Hororo today continue to agitate for formal acknowledgment from Nkore Cultural Institution and from the Uganda Government, of the injustices done to Mpororo, and to demand its reconstitution but have by the colonial but have received no formal response. Many of the people who are opposed to the re-establishment of expanded Nkore Kingdom are Bahororo who understand that re-establishing Nkore on territory that rightly belonged to the states of Mpororo is unfair.

References

Ethnic groups in Uganda